The 1997 Conservative Party leadership election was triggered when John Major resigned as leader on 2 May 1997, following his party's landslide defeat at the 1997 general election, which ended 18 years of Conservative Government of the United Kingdom. Major had been Conservative leader and prime minister since November 1990.

Candidates

Announced

The following candidates announced their intention to stand:
Kenneth Clarke
William Hague
Michael Howard
Peter Lilley
John Redwood

Announced but withdrew
Stephen Dorrell – withdrew in favour of Clarke before the ballot. Dorrell had the support of 8 or 9 MPs, some of whom did not transfer their support to Clarke due to his pro-European opinions.

Declined candidates
Michael Heseltine – had been widely expected to contest the leadership but declined to do so following health concerns. Heseltine supported Kenneth Clarke during the contest.

Not an MP at the time
In the months before the general election a number of other prominent Conservatives were talked about as potential leaders; however, several failed to hold their seats in the general election including the following:
Ian Lang
Michael Portillo
Malcolm Rifkind

In addition, many had speculated about Chris Patten returning to Westminster (he had lost his seat in the 1992 election) and becoming leader; however, the contest took place before Patten's term of office as Governor of Hong Kong ended.

Results

Howard was eliminated. He was regarded as a serious contender but had been damaged by the criticisms of Ann Widdecombe (who had served under him at the Home Office) that he had "something of the night about him" and by the decision of William Hague, who had originally agreed to support Howard and become Deputy Leader, to stand in his own right.

Peter Lilley withdrew voluntarily. He and Howard gave their backing to Hague.

Second round

Redwood was eliminated.

Final round

For the final round, Clarke, facing likely defeat by Hague, offered to stand aside in Michael Heseltine's favour. Heseltine was less unpopular with eurosceptics than Clarke, who was seen as the main Conservative Party champion of potential British membership of the planned euro. Heseltine, who had had a stent fitted after an attack of angina the day after the General Election, was tempted by the offer, but declined on medical advice.

Redwood gave his backing to Clarke, an unusual development in that Redwood (eurosceptic) and Clarke (europhile) held opposite views on the main issue of dispute amongst Conservatives. In return for the endorsement, it was generally understood that Clarke would name Redwood Shadow Chancellor.

This pact backfired, however, and the agreement was seen as so cynical that it drew comparison to the Nazi–Soviet Pact of the late 1930s. It prompted former Conservative Prime Minister Baroness Thatcher to publicly endorse Hague. In the event, most of Redwood's supporters switched to Hague rather than to Clarke.

Julian Lewis announced that he was the only MP who did not vote.

Aftermath

Under William Hague's leadership, the party would fail to make any significant advance at the 2001 general election, and he was succeeded by Iain Duncan Smith.

In 1998, the system of leadership elections was altered to one where MPs vote in rounds to select a shortlist of two candidates, who are then presented to the mass membership to choose. This system was first used in the 2001 leadership election and a modified form of these rules remains in place today.

An incumbent leader can still be ousted by a no confidence vote of Conservative MPs, as was done to Iain Duncan Smith in October 2003. A leader could therefore (in principle) be ousted by MPs despite still enjoying the support of the mass membership.

References

Books used for references
Kenneth Clarke, Kind of Blue, Macmillan, 2016, 
 Michael Heseltine, Life in the Jungle, Hodder & Stoughton, 2000, 

1997
Conservative leadership election
Conservative Party leadership election
Kenneth Clarke